Afsaneh Bayegan (born 2 January 1961) is an Iranian film and television actress and beauty pageant titleholder who placed 2nd Runner-Up at Miss Iran 1976. Born in Tehran, her artistic career started with the short film Boogh or The Horn by Ali Alinejad (1982).

Filmography
 Missing (1985)
 The Sanctuary of Courtship (1986)
 The High School (1986)
 The Organization (1986)
 Let Me Live (1986)
 The Tuberose (1987)
 The Punishment (1987)
 Tooba (1988)
 The Last Chance (1989)
 Mortal (1989)
 Shangool and Mangool (1989)
 Two Features with a Ticket (1990)
 Hungry Wolves (1991)
 The Chance to Live (1991)
 The Preserve (1991)
 The Crabs' Attack (1992)
 The Splendor of Returning (1992)
 Maryam and Mitil (1992)
 Alma (1992)
 The Simpleton (1992)
 Atal Matal Tootooleh (1992)
 The Stuntman (1993)
 Maryam and Mitil (1993)
 The Punishment (1994)
 The Spectacular Day (1994)
 Strange Sisters (1995)
 Not Forgiven (1996)
 Wounded (1997)
 Tathti (1997)
 The Rebel (1997)
 The Stunt Men (1997)
 The Changed Man (1998)
 Hand in Soil (1998)
 The Night Raid (1998)
 Tootia (1998)
 SMS from another World (2008)
 Shirin (2008)
 Superstar (2009)
 Women are amazing (2010)
 Flying Passion (2012)
 Negar (2017)

References

External links
 

1961 births
Living people
People from Tehran
Actresses from Tehran
Iranian film actresses
Iranian television actresses
20th-century Iranian actresses
Shahid Beheshti University alumni